Skrapar is a municipality in Berat County, southern Albania. It was created in 2015 by the merger of the former municipalities Bogovë, Çepan, Çorovodë, Gjerbës, Leshnjë, Potom, Qendër Skrapar, Vendreshë
and Zhepë. The seat of the municipality is the town Çorovodë. The total population is 12,403 (2011 census), in a total area of 832.04 km2. It covers part of the area of the former Skrapar District, without the town Poliçan.

It is also roughly contiguous with the Albanian "ethnographic region" of Skrapar which is known for its folklore, its raki production, its high rate of those belonging to the Bektashi order and its scenic mountains.

History  
The discovery of the cave settlements, graves, mosaics, coins and the ruins of bridges, churches, castles, have extended knowledge and evidence of an ancient human life in the area. Ancient objects are work tools belonging to the Neolithic period. Illyrian-Roman wars, come out through the pen of historians of different times like, Orgesi, Koragu, Gerunti, etc. According to them, the town was established in III century BC and Illyrians served as a fortress area of Skrapar and strategic character defence. During the Ottoman period, the region was known as İskarapar.

Gallery

See also 
Tomorrica

References

External links 
Visit Skrapar

Skrapar
Municipalities in Berat County
Administrative units of Skrapar
Albanian ethnographic regions
Populated places established in 2015